The Episcopal Diocese of Southern Ohio is the diocese of the Episcopal Church in the United States of America with jurisdiction over 40 counties in southern Ohio. It is one of 15 dioceses that make up the Province of the Midwest (Province 5). The offices of the Bishop of Southern Ohio and the cathedral, Christ Church Cathedral, are both located in downtown Cincinnati.

History

The Diocese of Southern Ohio was created from the Diocese of Ohio in 1875. The diocese's original cathedral, St. Paul Episcopal Cathedral, Cincinnati, was located in downtown Cincinnati but was demolished in 1937 due to structural problems. Thomas A. Jaggar became the first bishop in 1875. The see is currently vacant following the retirement of Thomas E. Breidenthal on November 29, 2020.

Bishop Wayne Smith of Missouri was elected as the Provisional Bishop on July 17, 2021.

List of churches and religious communities

Cincinnati area parishes
All Saints Episcopal Church, Pleasant Ridge
Ascension & Holy Trinity, Wyoming
Calvary Church, Clifton, Cincinnati
Christ Church, Glendale
Christ Church Cathedral, Downtown, Cincinnati
Church of Our Saviour, Mount Auburn, Cincinnati
Church of The Advent, East Walnut Hills, Cincinnati
Church of The Ascension, Middletown
Church of The Good Samaritan, Amelia
Church of The Redeemer, Hyde Park, Cincinnati
Grace Episcopal Church, College Hill
Holy Trinity Episcopal Church, Kenwood
Holy Trinity Episcopal Church, Oxford
Indian Hill Episcopal Church, Indian Hill (joint Presbyterian parish)
St. Andrew's Episcopal Church, Evanston, Cincinnati
St. Anne's Episcopal Church, West Chester
St. Barnabas Episcopal Church, Montgomery
St. James Episcopal Church, Westwood, Cincinnati
St. Patrick's Episcopal Church, Lebanon
St. Simon of Cyrene Episcopal Church, Lincoln Heights
St. Thomas Episcopal Church, Terrace Park
St. Timothy's Episcopal Church, Anderson Township
Trinity Episcopal Church, Hamilton

Columbus area parishes
All Saints Episcopal Church, New Albany
Church of St Edward, Whitehall
St. Alban's Episcopal Church, Bexley
St. Andrew's Episcopal Church, Pickerington
St. James Episcopal Church, Clintonville
St. John's Episcopal Church, Franklinton
St. John's Episcopal Church, Lancaster
St. John's Episcopal Church, Worthington
St. Luke's Episcopal Church, Granville
St. Mark's Episcopal Church, Upper Arlington
St. Matthew's Episcopal Church, Westerville
St. Patrick's Episcopal Church, Dublin
St. Paul's Episcopal Church, Logan
St. Peter's Episcopal Church, Delaware
St. Philip's Episcopal Church, Columbus
St. Stephen's Episcopal Church, Columbus
Trinity Episcopal Church, Columbus
Trinity Episcopal Church, London
Trinity Episcopal Church, Newark

Dayton area parishes
Christ Episcopal Church, Dayton
Christ Episcopal Church, Springfield
Christ Episcopal Church, Xenia
Church of Our Savior, Mechanicsburg
Church of The Epiphany, Urbana
St. Christopher's Episcopal Church, Fairborn
St. Francis Episcopal Church, Springboro
St. George's Episcopal Church, Dayton
St. James Episcopal Church, Piqua
St. Margaret's Episcopal Church, Trotwood
St. Mark's Episcopal Church, Dayton
St. Mary's Episcopal Church, Waynesville
St. Paul's Episcopal Church, Dayton
St. Paul's Episcopal Church, Greenville
Trinity Episcopal Church, Troy

Eastern area
Church of The Epiphany, Nelsonville
Church of The Good Shepherd, Athens
Grace Episcopal Church, Pomeroy
St. James Episcopal Church, Zanesville
St. John's Episcopal Church, Cambridge
St. Luke's Episcopal Church, Marietta
St. Peter's Episcopal Church, Gallipolis
Trinity Episcopal Church, McArthur

Central area
All Saints Episcopal Church, Portsmouth
Christ Episcopal Church, Ironton
All Saints Lutheran/Episcopal Community, Washington Court House
St. Mary's Episcopal Church, Hillsboro
St. Paul's Episcopal Church, Chillicothe
St. Philip's Episcopal Church, Circleville

Missions
Community of the Transfiguration, Motherhouse, Glendale
 Procter Center

List of bishops
The bishops of Southern Ohio have been:

Diocesan bishops
 Thomas Augustus Jaggar, (1875–1904)
 Boyd Vincent, (1904–1929)
 Theodore I. Reese, (1929–1931)
 Henry Wise Hobson, (1931–1959)
 Roger Blanchard, (1959–1970)
 John McGill Krumm, (1971–1980)
 William Black, (1980–1992)
 Herbert Thompson Jr., (1992–2005), deceased 2006
 Thomas E. Breidenthal, (2007–2020)

Other bishops
Boyd Vincent, coadjutor bishop (1889)
Theodore I. Reese, coadjutor bishop (1913)
Paul Jones, acting bishop (1929)
Henry Wise Hobson, coadjutor bishop (1930)
Roger W. Blanchard, coadjutor bishop (1958)
William Black, coadjutor bishop (1979)
Kenneth Lester Price Jr., suffragan bishop (1994-2012), interim bishop (2005-2007), assisting bishop (2015-present)
Nedi Rivera, assisting bishop (2010–present)
Wendell N. Gibbs, Jr., assisting bishop (2021 - present)
Wayne Smith, bishop provisional (2021–present)

See also

 List of bishops of the Episcopal Church in the United States of America

References

External links
 
 Website of Christ Church Cathedral
Website of the Episcopal Church
Journal of the Annual Convention, Episcopal  Diocese of Southern Ohio

Southern Ohio
Diocese of Southern Ohio
Religious organizations established in 1874
Anglican dioceses established in the 19th century
1874 establishments in Ohio
Christianity in Cincinnati
Province 5 of the Episcopal Church (United States)